Alec Page (born November 8, 1993) is a Canadian former competitive swimmer who focuses on individual medley events.  At the 2012 Summer Olympics in London, he finished 23rd overall in the preliminary heats of the men's 400-metre individual medley and failed to advance.

References

External links
 
 
 
 
 

1993 births
Living people
Canadian male medley swimmers
Olympic swimmers of Canada
Swimmers at the 2012 Summer Olympics
Swimmers at the 2015 Pan American Games
Pan American Games bronze medalists for Canada
Pan American Games medalists in swimming
Medalists at the 2015 Pan American Games